Dimmer is a surname. Notable people with the surname include:

Camille Dimmer (born 1939), Luxembourgish footballer and politician
John Dimmer (1883–1918), British World War I veteran
John Dimmer (born 1954 or 1955), Australian rules football coach and player